The Little Pigeon River is a  stream in Cheboygan County in the U.S. state of Michigan.

Tributaries 
From the mouth:
 (left) Silver Creek
 Silver Lake
 (left) North Branch Little Pigeon River
 (right) Morrow Creek
 (left) Middle Branch Little Pigeon River
 Kimberly Creek

References

Rivers of Michigan
Rivers of Cheboygan County, Michigan
Tributaries of Lake Huron